Secretarias (English: Secretaries) is an Ecuadorian TV show that was produced and broadcast by TC Televisión from 2013 through a final fourth season in June 2015. The show stars  and José Urrutia.

Cast
: Tete
Jose Urrutia: Jefe Luis Arteta
Fabiola Veliz: Carlota
Ruth Coello: Analia
Elena Gui: Pao
Carmen Angulo: Monse
Aurelio Heredia: Ricky 
Jose Corozo: Alejo
Ma. Fernanda Perez: Lucy
Karelina Macklif: María Conchita
Alex Pluas: Jipijapa Montecristi
Tomas Delgado: Martín

Ecuadorian television series
TC Televisión original programming